The list of cathedrals in Singapore, sorted by denominations, is as follows:


Roman Catholicism 
 Cathedral of the Good Shepherd, Civic District

Anglicanism 
 St. Andrew's Cathedral, Downtown Core

Eastern Orthodoxy 
 Holy Resurrection Cathedral of Singapore

See also 

 List of cathedrals
 Christianity in Singapore

References 

Cathedrals in Singapore
Singapore
Cathedrals
Cathedrals